German submarine U-1001 was a Type VIIC/41 U-boat of Nazi Germany's Kriegsmarine during World War II.

She was ordered on 14 October 1941, and was laid down on 31 December 1942, at Blohm & Voss, Hamburg, as yard number 201. She was launched on 6 October 1943, and commissioned under the command of Kapitänleutnant Ernst-Ulrich Blaudow on 18 November 1943.

Design
German Type VIIC/41 submarines were preceded by the heavier Type VIIC submarines. U-1001 had a displacement of  when at the surface and  while submerged. She had two shafts and two  propellers.

U-1001 was fitted with five  torpedo tubes (four fitted at the bow and one at the stern), fourteen torpedoes or 26 TMA or TMB Naval mines, one  SK C/35 naval gun, (220 rounds), one  Flak M42 and two  C/30 anti-aircraft guns. The boat had a complement of between forty-four and fifty-two.

Service history
U-1001 participated in six war patrols. None of these resulted in any ships damaged or sunk.

On 21 September, during her third war patrol, U-1001 laid 15 TMB near Porkkala, on the Baltic Sea. The next day, 22 Sep 1944, U-1001 rescued 13 shipwrecked German soldiers from the Baltic and landed them later on 2 October, at Libau.

U-1001 had Schnorchel underwater-breathing apparatus fitted out in February 1945.

U-1001 was sunk by depth charges in the North Atlantic south-west of Land's End, killing all forty-six of her crew.

See also
 Battle of the Atlantic

References

Bibliography

External links

German Type VIIC/41 submarines
U-boats commissioned in 1943
World War II submarines of Germany
1943 ships
Ships built in Hamburg
Maritime incidents in April 1945
World War II shipwrecks in the Atlantic Ocean
U-boats sunk by depth charges